Clarksville City is a city in Gregg and Upshur counties in the U.S. state of Texas. The population was 780 at the 2020 census.

History
The first settlers arrived in the area before 1845. There was a stagecoach stop at the home of William W. Walters, which was later owned and operated by Warren P. Victory. Though first known as "Gilead", the post office was named "Point Pleasant" in 1852. It closed in 1867. The community withered when the railroad bypassed it in 1873 and Gladewater was established. With the advent of the East Texas Oil Field in 1930, so many homes, businesses, and oil-company camps and offices sprang up along the highway that it was called the Main Street of Texas, and street numbers were designated from Longview to Gladewater. The area around George W. Clark's home on the site of the old stagecoach stop became known as "Clarksville".

After extensive paving projects and other civic improvements in the 1940s and the construction of Lake Gladewater in 1952, the nearby city of Gladewater had a high tax rate and was extending its boundaries. Industrialists in the area to the east became alarmed at the prospect of being taken into Gladewater and taxed more. A movement to incorporate, spearheaded by several oil companies and the L. W. Pelphrey Company, a general contractor specializing in oilfield construction, culminated in a vote to establish Clarksville City on September 14, 1956. Pelphrey was elected mayor and served until his death in August 1961. The bypassed portion of Old Highway 80 is named Pelphrey Drive in his honor.

The population dwindled as drilling reached the state allowable and producing wells became automated. Cities Service Oil Company closed its office and camp in the early 1960s, and Sun Oil Company soon followed. After a population low of 359 in the 1960s, growth was steady. In 1990 Clarksville City had 720 residents and twenty businesses. In 2000 the population was 806. The town has an elected mayor and council with a city manager form of government. The city hall was built in 1962 and doubled in size in 1991. A Texas historical marker for the old community of Point Pleasant is at the city hall.

Geography

The city is bordered by Gladewater to the west, Warren City to the northwest, and White Oak to the east. Lake Deverina on Campbell Creek is in the southern part of Clarksville City.

Demographics

At the census of 2010, there were 865 people living in the city. The population density was 127.9 people per square mile (49.4/km2). There were 337 housing units at an average density of 53.5 per square mile (20.7/km2). The racial makeup of the city was 92.56% White, 3.97% African American, 0.25% Native American, 0.62% from other races, and 2.61% from two or more races. Hispanic or Latino of any race were 1.36% of the population. In 2020, its population was 780; the racial makeup of the city following the 2020 census, within the 2020 American Community Survey, was: 74.6% non-Hispanic white, 5.1% African American, 1.3% Native American, 0.9% two or more races, and 18.1% Hispanic or Latino of any race.

Education
Most of Clarksville City is served by the Gladewater Independent School District.  A small portion of the town is in the White Oak Independent School District.

External links

 City of Clarksville City – TML City Officials Directory

References

Cities in Gregg County, Texas
Cities in Upshur County, Texas
Cities in Texas
Longview metropolitan area, Texas